The coronation of Bhumibol Adulyadej (Rama X) as king of Thailand took place on Friday 5 May 1950 at the Grand Palace, Bangkok. Bhumibol Adulyadej ascended the throne at the age of 18 upon the death of his older brother King Ananda Mahidol (Rama VIII) on Sunday 9 June 1946

Timeline of the royal coronation 

Brahmin gatherings the water to be blessed and used for the sacred water in Royal Coronation Ceremony.

21 April 
A ceremony is held at the ubosot of the Temple of the Emerald Buddha to make an inscription on the Royal Golden Plaque of the official title of His Majesty the King, and the Royal Golden Plaque of His Majesty's horoscope, as well as the engraving of the Royal Seal of State.

4 May 
The Royal Golden Plaque of the official title of His Majesty the King, the Royal Golden Plaque of His Majesty's horoscope, and the Royal Seal of State were officially transferred from the Temple of the Emerald Buddha to Phaisan Thaksin Throne Hall.

5 May 
The Royal Purification, or the "Song Muratha Bhisek" Ceremony, takes place at the Chakraphat Phimarn Royal Residence. "Muratha Bhisek" refers to the action of pouring holy water over the head of the king, also known as ablution. It is to be followed by the Anointment Ceremony at Phaisan Thaksin Throne Hall. Then His Majesty the King proceeds to the Bhadrapitha Throne and sits under the Royal Nine-tiered Umbrella, where the Chief Brahmin presents him with the Royal Golden Plaque of His Majesty's official title, the Royal Regalia, the Ancient and Auspicious Orders, and the Weapons of Sovereignty. After the Crowning and Investiture Ceremony, His Majesty presents the First Royal Command.

6 May

7 May

8 May

References 

1950 in Thailand
Bhumibol Adulyadej